Evangelina Villegas (October 24, 1924 – April 24, 2017) was a Mexican cereal biochemist whose work with maize led to the development of quality protein maize (QPM). She and her colleague from the International Maize and Wheat Improvement Center (CIMMYT), Surinder Vasal, shared the 2000 World Food Prize for this achievement. Villegas was the first woman to ever receive the World Food Prize.

Education 
Villegas did a B.A. chemistry and biology at the National Polytechnic Institute of Mexico and earned a M.Sc. on cereal technology from Kansas State University. She also earned a Ph.D. in cereal chemistry from the North Dakota State University.

Career 
In 1950, Villegas became a chemist at the Instiuto Nacional de Nutriologia. She would also work as a librarian in the Office of Special Studies. Then in 1957, in this same office, she began work for the Wheat Industrial Quality Chemical Evaluation. A decade later, she would move to the International Maize and Wheat Improvement Center in Mexico (CIMMYT). 

In the 1970s, Villegas would begin collaborative research with Vasal. Villegas was in charge of the lab investigating protein quality, while Vasal worked on developing QPM varieties that would gain widespread acceptance. Villegas and Vasal together combined existing "opaque-2" maize variety using molecular biology techniques. During this time, Villegas would be credited for the evaluation, development, and adaptation of a chemical methodology to screen large numbers of small samples for industrial wheat quality and maize nutritional and protein quality.

She would go on to be named Head of the General Service Laboratory in 1992, serve as a consultant for national programs for protein quality and industrial quality laboratories for Brazil, Argentina, and Guatemala. She would also be involved in the establishment of quality laboratories in India, Thailand, Egypt, Tunis, Ghana, the Philippines, Peru, Ecuador, Colombia, Bolivia, and Mexico.

Legacy 
While at the CIMMYT, Villegas created a scholarship for the "birders" (men hired to keep birds away from the grain). This allowed the men to go and pursue an education that they otherwise would not have been able to.

After her retirement, Villegas became an advisor to the Sasakwa Africa Association, to help improve agricultural technology in Africa. She would also act as an advisor to young scientists.

The chemical and analytical approaches she developed continue to aid the CIMMYT in their work to monitor protein quality in QPM. In 2017, CMMIYT named a laboratory in her honor.

Awards and honors 

 (1972): Distinguished alumni award: National Polytechnic Institute of Mexico
 (2000): Woman of the year: Mexico National Award
 (2000): World Food Prize (shared with Surinder Vasal)
 (2001): Lázaro Cárdenas Medal: National Polytechnic Institute of Mexico
 (2001): Alpha Delta Kappa: International Women of Distinction
 (2002): Doctor of Science (honoris causa): Chapingo Autonomous University
 (2013): Distinguished alumni award: Kansas State University

Selected publications 

 Evangelina Villegas, Edwin Theodore Mertz. 1971. Chemical screening methods for maize protein quality at CIMMYT. Número 20 de Research bulletin - International Maize and Wheat Improvement Center. Editor CIMMYT, 14 pp.

Books 

 S. Twumasi-Afriyie, w. Haag, Evangelina Villegas. 1999. Quality protein maize in Ghana: A partnership in research, development, and transfer of technology. En: Breth, SA (ed.)
 Enrique I. Ortega M., Reinald Bauer, Evangelina Villegas M. 1985. Métodos químicos usados en el CIMMYT para determinar la calidad de proteína de los cereales. 2ª edición de CIMMYT, 32 pp.
 Evangelina Villegas, Enrique Ortega Martínez, Reinald Bauer. 1984. Chemical methods used at CIMMYT for determining protein quality in cereal grains. Editor Protein Quality Laboratory, International Maize and Wheat Improvement Center, 35 pp.
 ——. 1968. Variability in lysine content of wheat, rye and triticale proteins. Editor International Maize and Wheat Improvement Center, 32 pp.
 ——. 1967. Variability in lysine content of wheat, rye and triticale proteins. Editor Dakota State University. 158 pp.
 ——. 1963. The role of sulfhydryl groups in flour. Editor Kansas State University, 124 pp.

References

1924 births
2017 deaths
Mexican biochemists
Mexican women chemists
Scientists from Mexico City
21st-century Mexican women scientists
Women biochemists
20th-century Mexican women scientists
21st-century Mexican scientists
20th-century Mexican scientists
Mexican expatriates in the United States
Agriculture and food award winners